In geometry, Plücker's conoid is a ruled surface named after the German mathematician Julius Plücker. It is also called a conical wedge or cylindroid; however, the latter name is ambiguous, as "cylindroid" may also refer to an elliptic cylinder.

Plücker's conoid is the surface defined by the function of two variables:

 

This function has an essential singularity at the origin.

By using cylindrical coordinates in space, we can write the above function into parametric equations

 

A generalization of Plücker's conoid is given by the parametric equations

 

where  denotes the number of folds in the surface. (Figure 5 for )

See also
Ruled surface
Right conoid

References
 A. Gray, E. Abbena, S. Salamon, Modern differential geometry of curves and surfaces with Mathematica, 3rd ed. Boca Raton, Florida:CRC Press, 2006.  
 Vladimir Y. Rovenskii, Geometry of curves and surfaces with MAPLE 

External links
 

Surfaces
Geometric shapes